Dichromia quinqualis is a moth of the family Erebidae first described by Francis Walker in 1859. It is found in the South Pacific including: Fiji, Queensland and Java.

Biology
The larvae feed on Cynanchum elegans, an Apocynaceae.

References

External links
B. & M. Bell: Images of Dichromia quinqualis at Flickr

Hypeninae
Moths of Oceania
Moths of Indonesia